Miss Guatemala of Miss Guatemala Universo is a national Beauty pageant in Guatemala. The pageant was founded in 1955, where the winners were sent to Miss Universe.

History

Miss Guatemala was founded in 1955 and sent its first winner to represent Guatemala at the 1955 Miss Universe Pageant. Guatemala last placement were top 10 in 2010 with Jessica Scheel, Top 40 at Miss World 2017 with Virginia Argueta, and Miss Earth 2017 Top 16.

Miss Guatemala beauty pageant franchised the three of the Big Four Major pageants such as Miss Universe, Miss World and Miss International. The Miss Guatemala winners traditionally represent Guatemala at Miss Universe, in other sides, the runners-up award to be Miss Guatemala Mundo and Miss International.

In 2016, Miss Universo Guatemala made a separate pageant. The winning title goes to Miss Universe. Meanwhile, Miss Guatemala Mundo will be together with Miss Guatemala Internacional title.

In 2020, the other Miss Guatemala Organization made a separate pageant and the winner title goes to Miss Earth. The runner-ups will be sent to Miss Intercontinental and Miss Tourism International.

International crowns

 One – Miss International winner: 
Ilma Julieta Urrutia Chang (1984)

Titleholders
The following women have represented Guatemala in the Big Four international beauty pageants, the four major international beauty pageants for women. These are Miss World, Miss Universe, Miss International and Miss Earth.

Titleholders under Miss Guatemala org.

Miss Guatemala Universo

In the past, the winner of the Miss Guatemala pageant was either appointed to represent the nation at Miss Universe or Miss International. However, the winner automatically earns the right to represent Guatemala at Miss Universe.

Miss Guatemala Mundo

Miss Guatemala Internacional

References

External links
Official website

 

 
Beauty pageants in Guatemala
Guatemalan awards
Guatemala
1955 establishments in Guatemala